Cheshire County is a county in the southwestern corner of the U.S. state of New Hampshire. As of the 2020 census, the population was 76,458. Its county seat is the city of Keene. Cheshire was one of the five original counties of New Hampshire, and is named for the county of Cheshire in England. It was organized in 1771 at Keene. Sullivan County was created from the northern portion of Cheshire County in 1827.

Cheshire County comprises the Keene, NH micropolitan statistical area.

Geography

Adjacent counties
 Sullivan County (north)
 Hillsborough County (east)
 Worcester County, Massachusetts (southeast)
 Franklin County, Massachusetts (southwest)
 Windham County, Vermont (west)

Geographical landmarks
 Mount Monadnock
 Pisgah State Park

Demographics

2000 census
As of the census of 2000, there were 73,825 people, 28,299 households, and 18,790 families living in the county. The population density was 104 people per square mile (40/km2). There were 31,876 housing units at an average density of 45 per square mile (17/km2). The county's racial makeup was 97.75% White, 0.37% Black or African American, 0.31% Native American, 0.47% Asian, 0.04% Pacific Islander, 0.18% from other races, and 0.89% from two or more races. 0.72% of the population were Hispanic or Latino of any race. 16.2% were of English, 13.1% French, 12.7% Irish, 9.3% American, 8.7% French Canadian, 6.7% Italian and 6.5% German ancestry. 95.5% spoke English, 1.4% French and 1.2% Spanish as their first language.

There were 28,299 households, of which 30.60% had children under the age of 18 living with them, 53.50% were married couples living together, 9.00% had a female householder with no husband present, and 33.60% were non-families. 25.50% of all households were made up of individuals, and 9.60% had someone living alone who was 65 years of age or older. The average household size was 2.47 and the average family size was 2.96.

23.30% of the county's population were under the age of 18, 11.70% were from 18 to 24, 27.00% were from 25 to 44, 24.30% were from 45 to 64, and 13.70% were 65 years of age or older. The median age was 38 years. For every 100 females there were 94.90 males. For every 100 females age 18 and over, there were 91.70 males.

The county's median household income was $42,382, and the median family income was $51,043. Males had a median income of $33,821 versus $25,328 for females. The county's per capita income was $20,685. About 4.40% of families and 8.00% of the population were below the poverty line, including 8.50% of those under age 18 and 6.30% of those age 65 or over.

2010 census
As of the 2010 United States census, there were 77,117 people, 30,204 households, and 19,284 families living in the county. The county's racial makeup was 96.3% white, 1.2% Asian, 0.5% black or African American, 0.3% American Indian, 0.4% from other races, and 1.4% from two or more races. Those of Hispanic or Latino origin made up 1.4% of the population. In terms of ancestry, 20.7% were English, 19.1% were Irish, 12.0% were German, 8.8% were French Canadian, 8.7% were Italian, 5.0% were Scottish, and 4.7% were American.

Of the 30,204 households, 27.8% had children under the age of 18 living with them, 49.9% were married couples living together, 9.4% had a female householder with no husband present, 36.2% were non-families, and 26.2% of all households were made up of individuals. The average household size was 2.40 and the average family size was 2.88. The median age was 40.7 years.

The county's median household income was $53,828 and the median family income was $65,936. Males had a median income of $46,014 versus $35,864 for females. The county's per capita income was $27,045. About 6.0% of families and 10.0% of the population were below the poverty line, including 10.5% of those under age 18 and 6.8% of those age 65 or over.

Politics and government

|}

County Commission
The executive power of Cheshire County's government is held by three county commissioners, each representing one of the three commissioner districts within the county.

In addition to the County Commission, there are five directly elected officials: they include County Attorney, Register of Deeds, County Sheriff, Register of Probate, and County Treasurer.

Legislative branch
The legislative branch of Cheshire County is made up of all of the members of the New Hampshire House of Representatives from the county. In total, there are 22 members from 18 different districts. After the 2022 elections, the party distribution and representatives were as follows.

Communities

City
 Keene (county seat)

Towns

 Alstead
 Chesterfield
 Dublin
 Fitzwilliam
 Gilsum
 Harrisville
 Hinsdale
 Jaffrey
 Marlborough
 Marlow
 Nelson
 Richmond
 Rindge
 Roxbury
 Stoddard
 Sullivan
 Surry
 Swanzey
 Troy
 Walpole
 Westmoreland
 Winchester

Census-designated places

 Hinsdale
 Jaffrey
 Marlborough
 North Walpole
 Troy
 Walpole
 West Swanzey
 Winchester

Villages

 Ashuelot
 Chesham
 Drewsville
 East Swanzey
 Jaffrey Center
 Munsonville
 Poocham
 Spofford
 West Chesterfield

See also
 National Register of Historic Places listings in Cheshire County, New Hampshire

References

External links

 Official Cheshire County web site
 Cheshire information pages at the University of New Hampshire
 National Register of Historic Places listing for Cheshire County
 Keene Pumpkin Festival
 Map of fire stations in Cheshire County

 
1769 establishments in New Hampshire
Populated places established in 1769